Yang Yaozu (born January 9, 1981, in Shanghai) is a Chinese sprinter. His personal best of 20.54 seconds in the 200 metres makes him the joint national record holder in the event. Formerly the number one Chinese sprinter, injuries have affected his performances since the 2006 season.

Achievements

Personal bests
100 metres - 10.21 s (2006)
200 metres - 20.54 s (2006)

References

External links
Yang Yaozu - Team China

1981 births
Living people
Athletes (track and field) at the 2004 Summer Olympics
Chinese male sprinters
Olympic athletes of China
Runners from Shanghai
Asian Games medalists in athletics (track and field)
Athletes (track and field) at the 2002 Asian Games
Athletes (track and field) at the 2006 Asian Games
Asian Games silver medalists for China
Asian Games bronze medalists for China
Medalists at the 2002 Asian Games
Medalists at the 2006 Asian Games